São Tomé International Airport  is an international airport located on São Tomé Island,  from the city of São Tomé. It is the main airport serving São Tomé and Príncipe.

Facilities

History
During the 1967-70 secession war from Nigeria (Nigerian Civil War), the airport served as the major base of operations for the Biafran airlift.  The airlift was an international humanitarian relief effort (the largest civilian airlift to date) that transported food and medicine to eastern Nigeria.  It is estimated to have saved more than a million lives.

Airlines and destinations

Statistics

Incidents and accidents
On 22 November 1962, Douglas C-54D-10-DC 7502 of the Portuguese Air Force crashed shortly after take-off for Portela Airport, Lisbon, Portugal, killing 22 of the 37 people on board.
On 15 May 1979: A Lockheed L-100-20 Hercules, registration D2-FAF, of TAAG Angola Airlines crashed on landing at São Tomé International Airport. There were no fatalities.
On 29 July 2017, Antonov An-74TK100 UR-CKC of CAVOK Air crashed on take-off and was damaged beyond repair. A birdstrike was reported and the aircraft overran the end of the runway whilst attempting to abort the take-off.

References

External links

 
 

Airports in São Tomé and Príncipe
Buildings and structures in São Tomé